The Rai River is a river of the Tasman Region of New Zealand's South Island. It flows predominantly south, reaching the Pelorus River at Pelorus Bridge. The township of Rai Valley is located close to the river's banks.

See also
List of rivers of New Zealand

References

Rivers of the Tasman District
Rivers of New Zealand